The Abdus Salam Medal (Official: Abdus Salam Medal for Science and Technology), is an award presented by TWAS, the academy of sciences for the developing world in Trieste. The Abdus Salam Medal was instituted in 1995 to honour the Academy's founder and first president, Nobel Laureate Professor Abdus Salam and is awarded to highly distinguished personalities who have served the cause of science in the Developing World.

Recipients

References

External links
Abdus Salam Medal for Science and Technology
Abdus Salam Medal

Italian science and technology awards
Abdus Salam